Philip Ridley Hall  (born 11 October 1967) is a British diplomat and solicitor, who has served as the British Consul-General to Jerusalem since August 2017.

Early life 
Philip Ridley Hall was born in Chichester, West Sussex on 11 October 1967. Hall was born to J. Ridley Hall and Janette Lavinia Hall.

Hall was educated at Cranleigh School, and attended Gonville and Caius College, Cambridge, graduating with a BA in Law in 1989. He completed a Postgraduate Certificate in European Integration (Law) at Saarland University, graduating in 1993. He later studied for an Executive Masters in Public Policy at the London School of Economics, graduating in 2017.

Career 
Between 1994 and 1997, Hall worked for HM Treasury. He joined the Foreign and Commonwealth Office in 1997; and headed the Middle East Peace Process Section from 1999 to 2001.

Hall served as the Deputy Head of the Africa Department (Equatorial) from 2001 to 2003.

Hall served as the Head of Division for the European Secretariat of the Cabinet Office from 2003 to 2006. He was the Deputy Head of Mission in Bucharest from 2007 to 2008, and served as the Defence Counsellor in the British Delegation to NATO from 2008 to 2012. He headed the Counter Proliferation Department from 2012 to 2015.

Hall led the Spending Review at the Foreign & Commonwealth Office from 2015 to 2016.

Consul-General to Jerusalem 
On 17 October 2016, Hall was appointed as the British Consul-General to Jerusalem. Hall took up the appointment in August 2017, succeeding Alastair McPhail.

In February 2021, Hall condemned Israeli settlements in the West Bank as "illegal and an obstacle to restarting peace talks".

Hall has been on the Board of Trustees for St. John Eye Hospital Group since September 2017.

Personal life 
Hall married his wife, Karine Hall, in 2005. They have three children, one son and two daughters.

References

External links 

 
 Biography on GOV.UK

21st-century British diplomats
1967 births
Living people
Officers of the Order of the British Empire
Consuls-General of the United Kingdom to Jerusalem
Alumni of Gonville and Caius College, Cambridge
Saarland University alumni
Alumni of the London School of Economics
People from Chichester
People educated at Cranleigh School